The water-water energetic reactor (WWER), or VVER (from ; transliterates as ; water-water power reactor) is a series of pressurized water reactor designs originally developed in the Soviet Union, and now Russia, by OKB Gidropress. The idea of such a reactor was proposed at the Kurchatov Institute by Savely Moiseevich Feinberg. VVER were originally developed before the 1970s, and have been continually updated. As a result, the name VVER is associated with a wide variety of reactor designs spanning from generation I reactors to modern generation III+ reactor designs. Power output ranges from 70 to 1300 MWe, with designs of up to 1700 MWe in development. The first prototype VVER-210 was built at the Novovoronezh Nuclear Power Plant.

VVER power stations have mostly been installed in Russia and the former Soviet Union, but also in China, the Czech Republic, Finland, Germany, Hungary, Slovakia, Bulgaria, India, Iran and Ukraine. Countries that are planning to introduce VVER reactors include Bangladesh, Egypt, Jordan, and Turkey.

History 
The earliest VVERs were built before 1970. The VVER-440 Model V230 was the most common design, delivering 440 MW of electrical power. The V230 employs six primary coolant loops each with a horizontal steam generator. A modified version of VVER-440, Model V213, was a product of the first nuclear safety standards adopted by Soviet designers. This model includes added emergency core cooling and auxiliary feedwater systems as well as upgraded accident localization systems.

The larger VVER-1000 was developed after 1975 and is a four-loop system housed in a containment-type structure with a spray steam suppression system (Emergency Core Cooling System). VVER reactor designs have been elaborated to incorporate automatic control, passive safety and containment systems associated with Western generation III reactors.

The VVER-1200 is the version currently offered for construction, being an evolution of the VVER-1000 with increased power output to about 1200 MWe (gross) and providing additional passive safety features.

In 2012, Rosatom stated that in the future it intended to certify the VVER with the British and U.S. regulatory authorities, though was unlikely to apply for a British licence before 2015.

The construction of the first VVER-1300 (VVER-TOI) 1300 MWE unit was started in 2018.

Design 

The Russian abbreviation VVER stands for 'water-water energy reactor' (i.e. water-cooled water-moderated energy reactor). The design is a type of pressurised water reactor (PWR). The main distinguishing features of the VVER compared to other PWRs are:

 Horizontal steam generators
 Hexagonal fuel assemblies
 No bottom penetrations in the pressure vessel
 High-capacity pressurizers providing a large reactor coolant inventory

Reactor fuel rods are fully immersed in water kept at (12,5 / 15,7 / 16,2 ) MPa pressure respectively so that it does not boil at the normal (220 to over 320 °C) operating temperatures. Water in the reactor serves both as a coolant and a moderator which is an important safety feature. Should coolant circulation fail, the neutron moderation effect of the water diminishes due to increased heat which creates steam bubbles which do not moderate neutrons, thus reducing reaction intensity and compensating for loss of cooling, a condition known as negative void coefficient. Later versions of the reactors are encased in massive steel reactor pressure vessels. Fuel is low enriched (ca. 2.4–4.4% 235U) uranium dioxide (UO2) or equivalent pressed into pellets and assembled into fuel rods.

Reactivity is controlled by control rods that can be inserted into the reactor from above. These rods are made from a neutron absorbing material and, depending on depth of insertion, hinder the chain reaction. If there is an emergency, a reactor shutdown can be performed by full insertion of the control rods into the core.

Primary cooling circuits 

As stated above, the water in the primary circuits is kept under a constant elevated pressure to avoid its boiling. Since the water transfers all the heat from the core and is irradiated, the integrity of this circuit is crucial. Four main components can be distinguished:

 Reactor vessel: water flows through the fuel assemblies which are heated by the nuclear chain reaction.
 Volume compensator (pressurizer): to keep the water under constant but controlled pressure, the volume compensator regulates the pressure by controlling the equilibrium between saturated steam and water using electrical heating and relief valves.
 Steam generator: in the steam generator, the heat from the primary coolant water is used to boil the water in the secondary circuit.
 Pump: the pump ensures the proper circulation of the water through the circuit.

To provide for the continued cooling of the reactor core in emergency situations the primary cooling is designed with redundancy.

Secondary circuit and electrical output 

The secondary circuit also consists of different subsystems:

 Steam generator: secondary water is boiled taking heat from the primary circuit. Before entering the turbine remaining water is separated from the steam so that the steam is dry.
 Turbine: the expanding steam drives a turbine, which connects to an electrical generator. The turbine is split into high and low pressure sections. To boost efficiency, steam is reheated between these sections. Reactors of the VVER-1000 type deliver 1 GW of electrical power.
 Condenser: the steam is cooled and allowed to condense, shedding waste heat into a cooling circuit.
 Deaerator: removes gases from the coolant.
 Pump: the circulation pumps are each driven by their own small steam turbine.

To increase efficiency of the process, steam from the turbine is taken to reheat coolant in the secondary circuit before the deaerator and the steam generator. Water in this circuit is not supposed to be radioactive.

Tertiary cooling circuit and district heating 

The tertiary cooling circuit is an open circuit diverting water from an outside reservoir such as a lake or river. Evaporative cooling towers, cooling basins or ponds transfer the waste heat from the generation circuit into the environment.

In most VVERs this heat can also be further used for residential and industrial heating. Operational examples of such systems are Bohunice NPP (Slovakia) supplying heat to the towns of Trnava (12 km away), Leopoldov (9.5 km away), and Hlohovec (13 km away), and Temelín NPP (Czech Republic) supplying heat to Týn nad Vltavou 5 km away. Plans are made to supply heat from the Dukovany NPP to Brno (the second-largest city in the Czech Republic), covering two-thirds of its heat needs.

Safety barriers 

A typical design feature of nuclear reactors is layered safety barriers preventing escape of radioactive material. VVER reactors have three layers:

 Fuel rods: the hermetic Zirconium alloy (Zircaloy) cladding around the uranium oxide sintered ceramic fuel pellets provides a barrier resistant to heat and high pressure.
 Reactor pressure vessel wall: a massive steel shell encases the whole fuel assembly and primary coolant hermetically.
 Reactor building: a concrete containment building that encases the whole first circuit is strong enough to resist the pressure surge a breach in the first circuit would cause.

Compared to the RBMK reactors – the type involved in the Chernobyl disaster – the VVER uses an inherently safer design because the coolant is also the moderator, and by nature of its design has a negative void coefficient like all PWRs. It does not have the graphite-moderated RBMK's risk of increased reactivity and large power transients in the event of a loss of coolant accident. The RBMK reactors were also constructed without containment structures on grounds of cost due to their size; the VVER core is considerably smaller.

Versions

VVER-440
One of the earliest versions of the VVER-type, that manifested certain problems with its containment building design. As it was at the beginning with the models V-230 and older not constructed to resist the design basis large pipe break, the manufacturer added with the newer model V-213 a so called Bubble condenser tower, that – with its additional volume and a number of water layers – has the aim to suppress the forces of the rapidly escaping steam without the onset of a containment-leak. As a consequence, all member-countries with plants of design VVER-440 V-230 and older were forced by the politicians of the European Union to shut them down permanently. Bohunice Nuclear Power Plant and Kozloduy Nuclear Power Plant had to close with this two respectively four of their units. Whereas in the case of the Greifswald Nuclear Power Plant, the German regulatory body had already  taken the same decision in the wake of the fall of the Berlin wall.

VVER-1000

When first built the VVER design was intended to be operational for 35 years. A mid-life major overhaul including a complete replacement of critical parts such as fuel and control rod channels was thought necessary after that. 
Since RBMK reactors specified a major replacement programme at 35 years designers originally decided this needed to happen in the VVER type as well, although they are of more robust design than the RBMK type. Most of Russia's VVER plants are now reaching and passing the 35 year mark. More recent design studies have allowed for an extension of lifetime up to 50 years with replacement of equipment. New VVERs will be nameplated with the extended lifetime.

In 2010 the oldest VVER-1000, at Novovoronezh, was shut down for modernization to extend its operating life for an additional 20 years; the first to undergo such an operating life extension. The work includes the modernization of management, protection and emergency systems, and improvement of security and radiation safety systems.

In 2018 Rosatom announced it had developed a thermal annealing technique for reactor pressure vessels which ameliorates radiation damage and extends service life by between 15 and 30 years.  This had been demonstrated on unit 1 of the Balakovo Nuclear Power Plant.

VVER-1200 

The VVER-1200 (or NPP-2006 or AES-2006) is an evolution of the VVER-1000 being offered for domestic and export use.
The reactor design has been refined to optimize fuel efficiency.
Specifications include a $1,200 per kW overnight construction cost, 54 month planned construction time, a 60 year design lifetime at 90% capacity factor, and requiring about 35% fewer operational personnel than the VVER-1000. The VVER-1200 has a gross and net thermal efficiency of 37.5% and 34.8%. The VVER 1200 will produce 1,198 MWe of power.

The first two units have been built at Leningrad Nuclear Power Plant II and Novovoronezh Nuclear Power Plant II. More reactors with a VVER-1200/491 like the Leningrad-II-design are planned (Kaliningrad and Nizhny Novgorod NPP) and under construction. The type VVER-1200/392M
as installed at the Novovoronezh NPP-II has also been selected for the Seversk, Zentral and South-Urals NPP. A standard version was developed as VVER-1200/513 and based on the VVER-TOI (VVER-1300/510) design.

In July 2012 a contract was agreed to build two AES-2006 in Belarus at Ostrovets and for Russia to provide a $10 billion loan to cover the project costs.
An AES-2006 is being bid for the Hanhikivi Nuclear Power Plant in Finland. The plant supply contract was signed in 2013, but terminated in 2022 mainly due to Russian invasion of Ukraine.

From 2015 to 2017 Egypt and Russia came to an agreement for the construction of four VVER-1200 units at El Dabaa Nuclear Power Plant.

On 30 November 2017, concrete was poured for the nuclear island basemat for first of two VVER-1200/523 units at the Rooppur Nuclear Power Plant in Bangladesh. The power plant will be a 2.4 GWe nuclear power plant in Bangladesh. The two units generating 2.4 GWe are planned to be operational in 2023 and 2024.

On 7 March 2019 China National Nuclear Corporation and Atomstroyexport signed the detailed contract for the construction of four VVER-1200s, two each at the Tianwan Nuclear Power Plant and the Xudabao Nuclear Power Plant. Construction will start in May 2021 and commercial operation of all the units is expected between 2026 and 2028.

From 2020 an 18-month refuelling cycle will be piloted, resulting in an improved capacity utilisation factor compared to the previous 12-month cycle.

Safety features 

The nuclear part of the plant is housed in a single building acting as containment and missile shield. Besides the reactor and steam generators this includes an improved refueling machine, and the computerized reactor control systems. Likewise protected in the same building are the emergency systems, including an emergency core cooling system, emergency backup diesel power supply, and backup feed water supply,

A passive heat removal system had been added to the existing active systems in the AES-92 version of the VVER-1000 used for the Kudankulam Nuclear Power Plant in India. This has been retained for the newer VVER-1200 and future designs. The system is based on a cooling system and water tanks built on top of the containment dome.
The passive systems handle all safety functions for 24 hours, and core safety for 72 hours.

Other new safety systems include aircraft crash protection, hydrogen recombiners, and a core catcher to contain the molten reactor core in the event of a severe accident. The core catcher will be deployed in the Rooppur Nuclear Power Plant and El Dabaa Nuclear Power Plant.

VVER-TOI
The VVER-TOI is developed from the VVER-1200. It is aimed at development of typical optimized informative-advanced project of a new generation III+ Power Unit based on VVER technology, which meets a number of target-oriented parameters using modern information and management technologies.

The main improvements from the VVER-1200 are:
power increased to 1300 MWe gross
upgraded pressure vessel
improved core design to improve cooling
further developments of passive safety systems
lower construction and operating costs with a 40-month construction time
use of low-speed turbines

The construction of the first two VVER-TOI units was started in 2018 and 2019 at the Kursk II Nuclear Power Plant.

In June 2019 the VVER-TOI was certified as compliant with European Utility Requirements (with certain reservations) for nuclear power plants.

An upgraded version of AES-2006 with TOI standards, the VVER-1200/513, is being built in Akkuyu Nuclear Power Plant in Turkey.

Future versions
A number of designs for future versions of the VVER have been made:

 MIR-1200 (Modernised International Reactor) – designed in conjunction with Czech company ŠKODA JS to satisfy European requirements
 VVER-1500 – VVER-1000 with dimensions increased to produce 1500 MWe gross power output, but design shelved in favour of the evolutionary VVER-1200
 VVER-1700 Supercritical water reactor version.
 VVER-600 two cooling circuit version of the VVER-1200 designed for smaller markets, authorised to be built by 2030 at the Kola Nuclear Power Plant.

Power plants

See the Wikipedia pages for each facility for sources.

Russia recently installed two nuclear reactors in China at the Tianwan Nuclear Power Plant, and an extension consisting of a further two reactors was just approved. This is the first time the two countries have co-operated on a nuclear power project. The reactors are the VVER 1000 type, which Russia has improved incrementally while retaining the basic design. These VVER 1000 reactors are housed in a confinement shell capable of being hit by an aircraft weighing 20 tonnes and suffering no expected damage. Other important safety features include an emergency core cooling system and core confinement system. Russia delivered initial fuel loads for the Tianwan reactors. China planned to begin indigenous fuel fabrication for the Tianwan plant in 2010, using technology transferred from Russian nuclear fuel producer TVEL.

The Tianwan Nuclear Power Plant uses many third party parts. While the reactor and turbo-generators are of Russian design, the control room was designed and built by an international consortium. In this way the plant was brought to meet widely recognised safety standards; safety systems were already mostly in place but the previous monitoring of these systems did not meet international safety standards. The new VVER 1000 plant built in China has 94% of its systems automated, meaning the plant can control itself under most situations. Refueling procedures require little human intervention. Five operators are still needed in the control room.

In May 2010 Russia secured an agreement with the Turkish government to build a power plant with four VVER-1200 reactors at Akkuyu, Turkey.  However, due to the accident experienced in Fukushima, anti-nuclear environmentalist groups heavily protested the proposed reactor at Akkuyu.

On 11 October 2011 an agreement was signed to build Belarus’ first nuclear power plant at Astravyets, using two VVER-1200/491 (AES-2006) reactors with active and passive safety systems. In July 2016, the reactor vessel for unit 1 has hit the ground during transportation, and though no damage was sustained it was decided to be replaced to allay public fears, delaying the project by a year. Unit 1 is, as of April 2020, planned to commence operation in 2020.

In October 2013 the VVER-1000 (AES-92) design was selected by the Jordan Atomic Energy Commission in a competitive tender for Jordan's first twin reactor nuclear power station.

In November 2015 and March 2017 Egypt signed preliminary agreements with Russian nuclear company Rosatom for a first VVER-1200 unit at El Dabaa to start operations in 2024. Discussions continue for final approval.

2.4 GWe Rooppur Nuclear Power Plant of Bangladesh is under construction. The two units of VVER- 1200/523 generating 2.4 GWe are planned to be operational in 2023 and 2024.

Technical specifications

Classification

See also
Nuclear power in Russia
Russian floating nuclear power station
VBER-300

Notes

References

External links
The VVER today, Rosatom, 2013
WWER-type reactor plants, OKB Gidropress
 - on AEM official pdf
VVER 1200 Construction - on AEM Official YouTube Channel

Nuclear power reactor types
Nuclear technology in the Soviet Union
Soviet inventions
Nuclear power in the Soviet Union
Pressurized water reactors